Beulah Louise Henry (September 28, 1887 – February 1973) was an American inventor. In the 1930s, she was given the nickname "Lady Edison" for her many inventions. According to the Journal of the Patent Office Society, in 1937, she was known as "America's leading feminine inventor".  Famed for being a prolific inventor, Henry patented a wide number of products and innovations designed to improve daily life. Her work was so well known and respected that, as of 1937, she had a museum exhibit dedicated to her in Osaka, Japan, which was seen as an inspiration to aspiring female Japanese inventors.

Her inventions include a bobbin-free sewing machine and a vacuum ice cream freezer. She received 49 patents and had around 110 inventions total.

Early life and education

She was born in Raleigh, North Carolina, the daughter of Walter R. and Beulah Henry. She was the granddaughter of former North Carolina Governor W. W. Holden and a direct descendant of President Benjamin Harrison. Like many great inventors, Beulah Louise Henry was not only a creative child, but an inquisitive one too. She enjoyed painting and music, but her favorite hobby was to point out things that she saw wrong and mention changes or innovations that could be made to improve them. One of her first ideas for an invention was a mechanical hat tipper that would tip a man’s hat automatically when he greeted someone. At nine years old, she is noted to have begun drawing sketches of inventions and by 1912, at age 25, she had her first patent, for a vacuum ice cream freezer. From 1909 to 1912 she attended North Carolina Presbyterian College and Elizabeth College in Charlotte, North Carolina, where she submitted her first patents.

Career – New York City

She moved to New York City by 1924, where she founded two companies. She worked as an inventor for the Nicholas Machine Works from 1939 to 1955. She also served as a consultant for many companies that manufactured her inventions, including the Mergenthaler Linotype Company and the International Doll Company. She lived in New York hotels, belonged to a variety of scientific societies, and never married.

While living in New York, Beulah Louise Henry established both Henry Umbrella and Parasol Company and later B.L. Henry Company.

Inventions
Unique from most inventors of the time, Henry's inventions did not always follow the same theme or category. One focus Henry had in terms of inventions was quality of life improving products for women. For instance, she invented a hair curler, vanity case, and a rubber sponge soap holder. One of her more prominent inventions was a "snap-on" parasol, which would allow women to change their parasol's pattern to match their outfit without needing to buy an entirely new parasol.

Beulah Louise Henry also delved into the market of children's toys by inventing a new method for stuffing dolls. As a substitute to using traditional, heavy stuffing, Henry devised a way to inflate lifelike dolls and toys with rubber tubing, which reduced the toys' weight immensely.

One of Henry's most famous inventions is the "Double Chain Stitch Sewing Machine". She wanted to make a sewing machine that wouldn’t tangle the thread. Bobbins are also required to be rewound and broken frequently, both quite inconveniencing. She saw this problem and decided that she could come up with an easier way. Her invention was double the speed of the typical sewing machine and allowed the user to use smaller threads. The stitch was also just as strong. This invention allowed seamstresses at the time to do larger loads and take on more jobs by eliminating time unnecessarily spent on fixing and untangling threads twisted by the bobbin. This invention is still used although it is adapted for modern times. It is primarily used in factories as it is faster than the typical sewing machine and breaks less often.

Another one of Henry's inventions, patented in 1936, was a tool that enabled the writing of multiple copies of a document on a typewriter without the use of carbon paper.

Beulah didn’t have any education in engineering which made her more creative when it came to solutions. She wasn’t restricted by what was technically possible, but she focused on what could be. The design would generally come to her fully formed in her head but because she didn’t have any education in engineering she had someone make the product for her. She made great use of prototyping with things she could find around her home such as soap, clips and buttons. If the engineers told her it couldn’t be done she would build it with on hand supplies to try and further convince them.

A partial list of Henry's inventions includes:

 Vacuum ice cream freezer (1912) 
 Umbrella with a variety different colored snap-on cloth covers (1924)
 First bobbinless sewing machine (1940)
 "Protograph" - worked with a manual typewriter to make four copies of a document (1932)
 "Continuously-attached Envelopes" for mass mailings (1952)
 "Dolly Dips" soap-filled sponges for children (1929)
 "Miss Illusion" doll with eyes that could change color and close (1935)
 Hair Curler (1925)
 Parasol Bag (1925)
 Umbrella Runner Shield Attachment (1926)
 Water-Sport Apparatus (1927)
 Poodle-Dog Doll (1927)
 Ball Covering (1927)
 Foot Covering (1927)
 Sealing Device for Inflatable Bodies (1929)
 Valve For Inflatable Articles (1929)
 Henry Closure Construction (1930)
 Henry Valve for Inflatable Articles (1931)
 Duplicating Device for Typewriting Machines (1932)
 Duplicating Attachment for Typewriters (1932)
 Writing Machine (1936)
 Multicopy Attachment for Typewriters (1936)
 Movable Eye Structure for figure Toys (1935)
 Double Chain Stitch Sewing Machine (1936)
 Feeding and Aligning Device (1940)
 Seam and Method of Forming Seams (1941)
 Sewing Apparatus (1941)
 Typewriting Machine (1941)
 Device for Producing Articulate Sounds (1941)
 Duplex Sound Producer (1944)
 Continuously Attached Envelopes (1952)
 Can Opener (1956)
 Direct and Return Mailing Envelope (1962)

Quotes 
"If necessity is the mother of invention, then resourcefulness is the father"

"I invent because I cannot help it - new things just thrust themselves on me"

Recognition
Henry received recognition during her life for her many inventions, working for many different companies as an innovator in New York City, such as the Mergenthaler Linotype Company as well as International Doll Company. Even though these companies often put their names on her work, she still was able to profit from these inventions and still received credit from these companies for her work on the inventions. At the time of her registering her patents, only 2% of all those patents were registered by women, making her truly impressive in her particular field and era. She is still considered one of the most successful female inventors of all time. After death, Henry was inducted into the National Inventors Hall of Fame in 2006.

References

External links
IEEE History Center Biography of Beula Louise Henry
MIT Inventor of the Week Archive about Henry
Bio including a picture
Innovative lives: exploring the history of women inventors
 http://cr4.globalspec.com/blogentry/4685/Beulah-Louise-Henry-Lady-Edison-1887-1973

Further reading
 A profile of Henry and her inventions is given in Stanley's Mothers and Daughters of Invention (1993, Scarecrow Press; 1995, Rutgers University Press), pp. 351–52, 366–67, 417, 420–26.  

1887 births
1973 deaths
American women engineers
Women inventors
People from North Carolina
20th-century American inventors